The St. Cloud Rox were a professional minor league baseball team that existed from 1946 to 1971 in St Cloud, Minnesota, playing in the Northern League for the duration of the franchise.

The St. Cloud Rox were an affiliate of the Minnesota Twins (1965–1971), Chicago Cubs (1960–1964), San Francisco Giants (1958–1959) and New York Giants (1946–1957).

Baseball Hall of Fame members Dave Bancroft (1947), Lou Brock (1961), Orlando Cepeda (1956) and Gaylord Perry (1958) are St. Cloud Rox alumni.

History

Located in St. Cloud, Minnesota, the team played its entire existence in the Northern League. The Rox were affiliates of the New York Giants from 1946 to 1957, the San Francisco Giants from 1958 to 1959, the Chicago Cubs from 1960 to 1964 and the Minnesota Twins from 1965 to 1971.

The original Rox ceased playing after the 1971 season when the old Northern League folded. Hall of Fame players to play for the Rox include Lou Brock, Orlando Cepeda and Gaylord Perry. Hall of Famer Dave Bancroft managed the team in 1947.

The franchise nickname returned in new form in 2012 replacing the St. Cloud Riverbats in the Northwoods League, a wooden bat collegiate summer baseball league. In 1997, collegiate summer baseball returned organized baseball to St. Cloud when the Dubuque Mud Puppies of the Northwoods League relocated and became the "St. Cloud River Bats".

Ballpark
The Rox played at Rox Park, also known as Municipal Stadium, located at Division Street and 25th Avenue. It opened in 1948 and was demolished in 1971. The park capacity fluctuated from 5,000 in 1947 to 3,600 in 1949. The played their final season at the newly constructed Municipal Stadium (now Dick Putz Field).

Year-by-year record

Notable alumni

Baseball Hall of Fame alumni
 Dave Bancroft (1947, MGR) Inducted, 1971
 Lou Brock (1961) Inducted, 1985
 Orlando Cepeda (1956) Inducted, 1999
 Gaylord Perry (1958) Inducted, 1991

Notable alumni
 Matty Alou (1958) 2x MLB All-Star; 1966 NL Batting Title
 Bobby Bolin (1958)
 Steve Brye (1967)
 Charlie Fox (1948–1950, 1952–1956)
 Dave Goltz (1968)
 Carroll Hardy (1968)
 George Mitterwald (1965–1966)
 Andre Rodgers (1955)
 Jimmy Stewart (1962)
 Tony Taylor (1955) 2x MLB All-Star
 Danny Thompson (1968) Died Age 29.
 Ozzie Virgil Sr. (1953)
 Leon Wagner (1955) 3x MLB All-Star; 1962 All-Star Game Most Valuable Player

See also
St. Cloud Rox players

References

External links 
 St. Cloud Rox in MNopedia, the Minnesota Encyclopedia

Baseball teams established in 1946
Northern League (1902-71) baseball teams
1946 establishments in Minnesota
1971 disestablishments in Minnesota
Sports clubs disestablished in 1971
Sports in St. Cloud, Minnesota
New York Giants minor league affiliates
Chicago Cubs minor league affiliates
San Francisco Giants minor league affiliates
Minnesota Twins minor league affiliates
Defunct baseball teams in Minnesota
Baseball teams disestablished in 1971